John Alexander Curtis (August 22, 1834 – June 27, 1913) was an American politician who served in the Virginia House of Delegates.

References

External links 

1834 births
1913 deaths
Democratic Party members of the Virginia House of Delegates
Politicians from Richmond, Virginia
19th-century American politicians
20th-century American politicians